The 1915 Colorado Agricultural Aggies football team represented Colorado Agricultural College (now known as Colorado State University) in the Rocky Mountain Conference (RMC) during the 1915 college football season.  In their fifth season under head coach Harry W. Hughes, the Aggies compiled a perfect 7–0 record, won the RMC championship, and outscored all opponents by a total of 244 to 31.

Three Colorado Agricultural players received all-conference honors in 1915: guard Frank Wilson, center Charles Shepardson, and end Ralph (Sag) Robinson.

The 1915 team remains the only team in school history to compile a perfect season.

Schedule

References

Colorado Agricultural
Colorado State Rams football seasons
Rocky Mountain Athletic Conference football champion seasons
Colorado Agricultural Aggies football